Janine Ricalde Pontejos (born October 29, 1992) is a Filipino professional basketball player. She also represents the Philippine national team in international competitions.

College
Janine Pontejos first took up basketball growing up with her siblings in Lemery, Batangas. Her first competitive experience in the sport was as a varsity player of De La Salle Lipa. She part of both the school's athletics and basketball team. She later transferred to the Centro Escolar University and became part of the CEU Lady Scorpions. With the Lady Scorpions, she was named MVP for four times in the Women's National Collegiate Athletic Association (WNCAA) and her team dominated the National Athletic Association of Schools, Colleges and Universities (NAASCU).

As of 2021, she is part of the CEU Lady Scorpions staff as an assistant coach.

Club
Pontejos has played in the Women's National Basketball League in the Philippines. In its first season in 2019, Pontejos led the Taguig Lady Generals to a second place finish and she was named as season MVP. In the 2022 season, she helped the Philippine Army Lady Battalions clinch the WNBL title.

National team
Pontejos has played for the Philippine national team. She was a part of the Philippines national 3x3 side which took part in the 2018 FIBA 3x3 World Cup which was hosted in Bocaue, Bulacan. As an individual, she won the gold medal in that tournament's shoot-out competition.

She has suit up for the team in the 2019 Southeast Asian Games were she two gold medals; as part of the traditional 5-a-side team and the 3x3 national team. She also played for the country at the 2019 William Jones Cup.

Personal life
Pontejos joined the Philippine Army in 2020. She holds the rank of Private First Class as of 2022.

References

1992 births
Living people
Competitors at the 2017 Southeast Asian Games
Competitors at the 2019 Southeast Asian Games
Filipino women's basketball players
Philippines women's national basketball team players
Southeast Asian Games medalists in basketball
Southeast Asian Games gold medalists for the Philippines
Centro Escolar University alumni
Basketball players from Batangas
Competitors at the 2021 Southeast Asian Games